Michael Alexander or Mike Alexander may refer to:

Michael Alexander (academic) (born 1970), American scholar of Jewish history
Michael Alexander (bishop) (1799–1845), first Anglican bishop of the Diocese of Jerusalem
Michael Alexander (British Army officer) (1920–2004), British Army officer and writer
Michael Alexander (diplomat) (1936–2002), British diplomat
Michael Alexander (Trinidadian boxer) (born 1993), Trinidadian boxer
Michael J. Alexander (born 1941), British professor of English literature
Mike Alexander (businessman) (born 1947), British businessman
Mike Alexander (gridiron football) (born 1965), National Football League wide receiver
Mike Alexander (1977–2009), bassist for English thrash metal band Evile
Mike Alexander (racing driver) (born 1957), NASCAR Winston Cup driver and 1982 NASCAR Weekly Series national champion

See also